Quintus Petilius Secundus was a Roman legionary. He was born around 40 AD, probably in Milan and died 25 years later in Bonn.

Quintus Petilius Secundus, son of Quintus Petilius came from Milan and was part of the voting district (Tribus) Oufentina. Petilius was a soldier of the Legio XV Primigenia and was noted for his early construction work in the Bonn area of modern-day Germany. His tombstone was found in 1755 in the Electoral Palace. It is now housed in the Rheinisches Landesmuseum Bonn.

References
This article was initially translated from the German Wikipedia.

Ancient Roman soldiers
Military personnel from Milan
40 births
65 deaths
Petilii